John Roeslein is a retired American soccer player who was a member of championship teams at the high school, junior college, NCAA Division I and professional levels.  He played two seasons in the American Soccer League where he was the 1976 Rookie of the Year.

Youth
Roeslein grew up in St. Louis, Missouri playing for numerous notable youth teams.  He attended St. Mary's High School which won the 1970 Missouri High School soccer championship.  He attended Florissant Valley Community College, playing for the school's soccer team in 1971 and 1972.  He and his teammates won the 1971 National Junior College National Championships.  In 1973, he transferred to St. Louis University where he won the 1973 NCAA Men's Soccer Championship.

Professional
In 1976, Roeslein signed with the New Jersey Americans of the American Soccer League.  He shared Rookie of the Year honors with Steve Ralbovsky.  He also played briefly on loan with Welsh club Tranmere Rovers F.C. in 1976. In 1977, the New Jersey Americans won the ASL championship.

Amateur
He retired from professional soccer following the 1977 season and returned to St. Louis where he played the rest of his career with local amateur teams.  In 1978, he was with Busch Gardens S.C. before moving to St. Louis Kutis S.C. in 1979.  He has also coached extensively on the youth level in the St. Louis area.  He was inducted into the St. Louis Soccer Hall of Fame in 2008.

References

American soccer players
American expatriate soccer players
American Soccer League (1933–1983) players
New Jersey Americans (ASL) players
Saint Louis Billikens men's soccer players
St. Louis Kutis players
Soccer players from St. Louis
Living people
Association football forwards
Association football midfielders
Year of birth missing (living people)
Tranmere Rovers F.C. players
Expatriate footballers in England
American expatriate sportspeople in England